Peter Jaroš (born 22 January 1940) is a Slovak writer.

Jaroš was born in Hybe to a family of a builder. From 1957 to 1962 he studied Slovak and Russian at Comenius University in Bratislava. After finishing college, he worked as an editor at the publishing house Mladé letá. Between 1962 and 1965 he was an editor of the weekly Kultúrny Život, then, until 1971, he worked for Slovak Radio in Bratislava. From 1972 he was a screenwriter and later a playwright at Slovak Motion Picture. He wrote the script for Martin Ťapák's film Pacho the Brigand of Hybe (based on his short story), the script of Juraj Jakubisko's A Thousand-year-old Bee (also based on a Jaroš work) and others, for which he was awarded internationally (Golden Phoenix in the Venice International Film Festival, Union Critics Prize at the Seville Festival of European Cinema).

From 1992-1994 he was a Party of the Democratic Left Member of the National Council of the Slovak Republic From 1996 to 1999 he worked in the National Centre for Slovak Literature. At present he works in the National Centre for Edification in Bratislava.

Selected works 

Novels:
 Afternoon on Terrace
 Millennial bee
 Mute ear, Dumb eye

Stories:
 "A Thousand-year-old Bee" (1983)
 "Snow Underfoot" (1978)
 "Pacho the Brigand of Hybe" (1975)

Screenplay:
 A Thousand-year-old Bee (1983)
 A day of solstice (1974)

Plays:
 Price Courage (1986)
 Glasshouse Venus (1985)

References

External links 
 

1940 births
Living people
People from Liptovský Mikuláš District
Party of the Democratic Left (Slovakia) politicians
Members of the National Council (Slovakia) 1992-1994
Slovak dramatists and playwrights
Slovak writers